Southlands High School is a coeducational secondary school in Chorley, Lancashire, United Kingdom. It has approximately 1,000 students per annum.

Awards
 Lancashire Evening Post School Of The Year 2012 Lancashire Evening Post Best in Education Awards 2012
 Arts Mark
 Lancashire Healthy Schools (Flagship Healthy School)

References

External links
Southlands High School Web Site
Lancashire healthy schools

Secondary schools in Lancashire
Schools in Chorley
Academies in Lancashire
Educational institutions established in 1955
1955 establishments in England